Klara Lukan (born 8 September 2000) is a Slovenian athlete. She competed in the women's 3000 metres event at the 2021 European Athletics Indoor Championships.

References

External links
 

2000 births
Living people
Slovenian female middle-distance runners
Place of birth missing (living people)
Athletes (track and field) at the 2020 Summer Olympics
Olympic athletes of Slovenia